Dahua Yao Autonomous County is a county of west-central Guangxi, China. It is under the administration of Hechi city. It was established in 1987 on 23 December.

References 

 
County-level divisions of Guangxi
Administrative divisions of Hechi
Yao autonomous counties